Gershon Ben-Shakhar (גרשון בן שחר; born May 25, 1942) is an Israeli psychologist. He served as president of the Open University of Israel.

Academic career
Gershon Ben-Shakhar earned a B.A. in Psychology and Statistics (1966), an M.A. in Psychology (1970), and a Ph.D. in Psychology (1975) from The Hebrew University of Jerusalem. He was a Post-Doctoral Fellow at Northwestern University in Evanston, Illinois, from 1975 to 1976.

Ben-Shakhar taught in the Department of Psychology at The Hebrew University of Jerusalem from 1981 on, ultimately as a Professor and for a time as the Chair of the Department and the Dean of the Faculty of Social Sciences.

In 2003 he became president of the Open University of Israel, succeeding Eliahu Nissim.

Published works
Along with John J. Furedy he wrote the book Theories and Applications in the Detection of Deception: A psychophysiological and international perspective (New York: Springer-Verlag, 1990).

Awards and recognition
In 2011 he was an EMET Prize Laureate.

References 

Living people
Hebrew University of Jerusalem alumni
Northwestern University alumni
Academic staff of the Hebrew University of Jerusalem
Academic staff of the Open University of Israel
Presidents of universities in Israel
1942 births
Israeli psychologists
EMET Prize recipients in the Social Sciences
Israeli expatriates in the United States